Tell Karatine  is a Syrian village located in Saraqib Nahiyah in Idlib District, Idlib.  According to the Syria Central Bureau of Statistics (CBS), Tell Karatine had a population of 1502 in the 2004 census.

References 

Populated places in Idlib District